Smotrych is a  peak located in the Chornohora (Чорногора) mountain range of Carpathian Mountains in western Ukraine. It is situated near Dzembronia in Ivano-Frankivsk Oblast.

References

Geography of Ivano-Frankivsk Oblast
Mountains of the Eastern Carpathians
One-thousanders of Ukraine